She Loves and Lies is a 1920 American silent comedy drama film directed by Chester Withey and starring Norma Talmadge, Conway Tearle, and Octavia Broske.

An incomplete surviving print is preserved in the Library of Congress collection.

The film had the working title Two Women.

Plot
As described in a film magazine, Marie Callender (Talmadge) becomes engaged to a wealthy Lothario, but regrets it after Ernest Lismore (Tearle), who is in financial difficulties, rescues her from a burning building. She breaks the engagement but is left the wealthy man's fortune. Learning of Ernest's predicament, she poses as an elderly woman and proposes that Ernest marry her to save himself from financial ruin. He agrees, and after their marriage Marie poses as a painter in the bohemian quarter of the city to see if Ernest will love her. After several difficulties Marie removes her wig and Ernest happily discovers that she is the painter who won his heart.

Cast
 Norma Talmadge as Marie Callender / Marie Max / June Dayne
 Conway Tearle as Ernest Lismore
 Octavia Broske as Polly Poplar
 Phillips Tead as Bob Brummel
 Ida Darling as Carrie Chisholm
 John T. Dillon (minor role)
 Eva Gordon (minor role)

References

External links

She Loves and Lies reviews at the Norma Talmadge website
Stills at silenthollywood.com

1920 films
American silent feature films
American black-and-white films
Films directed by Chester Withey
1920s English-language films
1920 comedy-drama films
Selznick Pictures films
1920s American films
Silent American comedy-drama films